The United Laboratories, Inc., commonly known as Unilab (stylized in uppercase), is a Philippine private pharmaceutical company based in Mandaluyong.

Unilab is the largest pharmaceutical company in the Philippines in terms of market share. As of 2016, it accounts for 25.1% of the market share in the Philippines ahead of foreign multinational companies Pfizer and GlaxoSmithKline.

History
United Laboratories or Unilab started out in 1945 as a small drugstore at Santo Cristo Street in Binondo, Manila with the name United Drug Co. It was co-founded by Jose Yao Campos, Mariano K. Tan, and Arsenio Ong. With the aid of Howard Q. Dee, Campos' brother-in-law, the company significantly grew within its first 14 years of operations and by 1959, the business was already exporting its products to Hong Kong.

Unilab benefitted from Campos' close association with President Ferdinand Marcos, although the company already has had relative success prior to Marcos' presidency and the imposition of martial law in the 1970s. During the Marcos administration, Unilab was granted exclusive license to import pharmaceuticals.

From the 1960s to the 2000s, Unilab established presence in other countries in Southeast Asia including Thailand, Vietnam, Indonesia, Singapore, and Myanmar, as well as in United States of America, Canada, Mexico, Brazil, Spain, Portugal, France, Italy, Germany, Belgium, Luxembourg, Netherlands, Switzerland, Czech Republic, Austria, Sweden, Finland, Denmark, Norway, Australia, New Zealand, Japan, South Korea, China, Taiwan, Macau, and Hong Kong.

In 2002, Unilab entered the generics drug industry by setting up RiteMed.

Unilab established Synnovate Pharma Corp. in 2013 marking the start of its involvement in plant-based medicine. In 2016, Unilab through its subsidiary RiteMed Philippines, Inc. fully acquired Pharex HealthCorp, a generic drug company under Pascual Laboratories Inc.

Also in 2013, Unilab started the operation of Mount Grace Hospitals, Inc., a string of locally respected and prominent hospitals in key areas across the country which the company has shared ownership of. They call these health facilities as "partner hospitals," examples of which are Mary Mediatrix Medical Center in Lipa City, Batangas, HealthServ Los Banos Medical Center in Laguna, and Tagaytay Medical Center in Cavite, to name a few.

In 2021, during the COVID-19 pandemic, Unilab announced plans to set up a vaccine manufacturing plant by 2023.

Products

Unilab's products include branded medicine such as Biogesic and Alaxan and vitamin supplements such as Conzace and Enervon. Unilab also owns the generic drug brand RiteMed and Pharex, both of which are managed under its subsidiary RiteMed Philippines, Inc.

Subsidiaries
Unilab, Inc.
Amherst Laboratories
Belmont Softgel Pharma Corporation
Bio-ONCO
Biofemme
Biomedis
LRI-Therapharma (formerly LR Imperial Inc. and Therapharma)
Medichem
Mount Grace Hospitals, Inc
Pediatrica
UAP (United American Pharmaceuticals)
Unilab Consumer Health (formerly the Proprietary Business (Probus) division)
Westmont
RiteMed
Pharex HealthCorp
UL Skin Sciences (formerly Innovitelle and Myra)
UL Health Services
UNAHCO (Univet Nutrition and Animal Health Company, formerly Univet Agricultural Products)

Former subsidiaries
Myra (now a brand under UL Skin Sciences)

References

External links
 

Pharmaceutical companies of the Philippines
Philippine companies established in 1945
Companies based in Mandaluyong
Pharmaceutical companies established in 1945
Privately held companies of the Philippines